The following data is current as of the end of the 2017 season, which ended after the 2017 NCAA Division II Football Championship. The following list reflects the records according to the National Collegiate Athletic Association. This list takes into account results modified later due to NCAA action, such as vacated victories and forfeits.

References

Lists of college football team records